The Roman Catholic Diocese of Prince George was created as the Vicariate Apostolic of Prince Rupert on January 14, 1944, when the Vicariate Apostolic of Yukon-Prince Rupert was split. It is a suffragan of the Archdiocese of Vancouver. It was elevated on July 13, 1967. , the bishop is Stephen Jensen.

Diocesan Demographics
The diocese consists of 1 emeritus bishop, 1 bishop, 5 religious and 16 diocesan priests, 4 brothers, 17 sisters, all serving 51,200 Catholics in 18 parishes, 20 missions and 8 schools.

History
The first priest to baptise in the area of Fort George was Father Demers in 1842.
In 1885, Father Adrien-Gabriel Morice, OMI, served the Carrier and Sekani First Nations from Stuart Lake. He created the first writing system for the Carrier language, the Carrier syllabics, and translated the Carrier prayer book, which is still used today. Father Morice was also credited with the first map of the interior of British Columbia, published by the government in 1907.

On January 14, 1944, the Vicariate Apostolic of Yukon-Prince Rupert split into the Vicariate Apostolic of Prince Rupert and the Vicariate Apostolic of Whitehorse. The Peace Region of BC, which was part of the old Archdiocese of Grouard-MacLennan, became part of the newly formed Vicariate of Prince Rupert. Emile-Marie Bunoz became the first bishop of the newly formed territory.

in 1956, Bishop John Fergus O'Grady, OMI, became the third bishop of the vicariate. Under his leadership, the number of schools was greatly increased to thirteen. The Frontier Apostolate was created by Bishop O'Grady to help staff the schools and administrations. 1960, Prince George College (later known as O'Grady Catholic High School) was built and staffed by the Sisters of Mercy, of Ireland.

On July 13, 1963, Vicariate Apostolic of Prince Rupert was elevated to a diocese and changed its name to Diocese of Prince George. The administration moved from Prince Rupert to Prince George.

During the 1980 and 1990s, the diocese suffered financial setbacks. The diocese had to sell off property and its debt was paid off by 1996. Immigration Canada changed its rules around recruiting from other countries and the Frontier Apostolate, which helped bring immigration to the area, came to an end. Low registration also forced the closure of O'Grady Catholic High School in Prince George in 2001 and, in 2008, St. Joseph's elementary in Vanderhoof.

Ordinaries
Emile-Marie Bunoz, O.M.I. (1944–1945)
Anthony Jordan, O.M.I. (1945–1955), appointed Coadjutor Archbishop of Edmonton, Alberta
John Fergus O'Grady, O.M.I. (1955–1986)
Hubert Patrick O'Connor, O.M.I. (1986–1991) 
Gerald William Wiesner, O.M.I. (1992-2013) - Bishop Emeritus
Stephen Jensen (2013–present)

Churches

Prince George  
Sacred Heart Cathedral
Saint Mary's Parish 
Christ our Saviour Parish 
Immaculate Conception Parish 
St. Theresa’s Mission (Ft. Babine, Ft. Ware, TsayKeh, Takla)  
Burns Lake  
Immaculata Parish 
Grassy Plains Mission  
Chetwynd  
Our Lady of Peace Parish 
Holy Cross Mission (Tumbler Ridge) 
St. Theresa’s Mission (Camp Emile)  
Dawson Creek  
Notre Dame Parish 
St. Anne Mission (Kelly Lake)  
Fort St. James  
Our Lady of the Snows 
St. Cecilia Mission (Tache) 
Portage Mission  
Fort St. John 
Church of the Resurrection 
Doig Mission
Halfway Mission
Blueberry Mission

Fraser Lake 
St. Andrew’s Parish 
Nadleh Mission
Stellaquo Mission 
Kitimat  
Christ the King Parish  
McBride  
St. Patrick’s Parish  
Mackenzie  
St. Peter’s Parish  
New Hazelton 
St. Mary’s Parish 
St. Felix Mission, (Stewart) 
Holy Rosary Mission, (Moricetown)  
Prince Rupert 
Annunciation Parish 
Our Lady of the Islands Mission (Queen Charlottes)  
Smithers  
St. Joseph’s Parish 
St. Anthony’s Mission (Houston)  
Terrace  
Sacred Heart Parish  
Vanderhoof  
St. Joseph’s Parish 
Stoney Creek Mission

Education

Catholic high schools
 O'Grady Catholic High School, of Prince George, was opened in 1960 and closed 2001.

Catholic elementary schools

See also
 Lejac Residential School, the memorial site of Rose Prince.

Notes
 The Northern Catholic News is published by the diocese for the community.

References

Bibliography
 Grave of B.C. First Nations woman draws pilgrims seeking miracles from CBC News retrieved Oct. 16, 2008
Diocese of Prince George - Annual Lejac Pilgrimage

External links
Diocese of Prince George site

Prince George